The European Marine Energy Centre (EMEC) Ltd is a UKAS accredited test and research center focusing on wave and tidal power development based in the Orkney Islands, UK. The centre provides developers with the opportunity to test full-scale grid-connected prototype devices in unrivalled wave and tidal conditions.

In addition to EMEC's wave and tidal sites, EMEC has an onshore hydrogen production plant in Eday where green hydrogen is generated from surplus tidal and wind energy with a view of developing a hydrogen economy in Orkney.

The operations are spread across five sites across Orkney:

 Billia Croo wave energy test site, Mainland (wave power)
 Fall of Warness tidal energy test site, off the island of Eday (tidal power)
 Caldale Hydrogen Production Plant, on Eday
 Scale wave test site at Scapa Flow, off St Mary's Bay
 Scale tidal test site at Shapinsay Sound, off Head of Holland
 Stromness (office and data facilities)

EMEC was established by a grouping of public sector organizations following a recommendation by the House of Commons Science and Technology Committee in 2001. In addition to providing access to areas of the sea with high wave and tidal energy potential, the centre also offers various kinds of support regarding regulatory issues, grid connection and meteorological monitoring as well as local research and engineering support.

Wave power testing at EMEC

EMEC's wave test facility is situated on the western edge of the Orkney mainland, in an area with high wave energy potentials in Europe. The exposed North Sea location means the island group is subjected to the powerful dynamic forces of the North Atlantic Ocean, with the highest wave recorded by EMEC reaching over 18 meters. Construction of the wave test facility was completed in October 2003, and operational activities commenced shortly thereafter. The center's facilities consist of five cabled test berths, ranging from 50-70m water depth off Billia Croo, Stromness on the Orkney mainland (some 2 km offshore) and two shallow water berths situated close to EMEC's onshore substation.

The following technologies have been installed and tested at the Billia Croo wave test site:

Pelamis Wave Power (PWP) installed its prototype Pelamis 750 device on site for full-scale testing in August 2004. This wave energy conversion machine was the first in the world to generate electricity into a grid system from offshore wave energy.
Scottish Power and Pelamis Wave Power tested a second-generation Pelamis P2 device in conjunction with a second P2 device, previously owned by E.on from 2010. but now transferred to Pelamis Wave Power in 2013.
AW-Energy from Finland undertook stand-alone mechanical testing in 2005 in the shallower waters at the test site.
Aquamarine Power Ltd installed its Oyster wave power device on the seabed in August 2009 and generated electricity for the first time in November of the same year.  Aquamarine installed its Oyster 2 800 kW wave energy converter in the summer of 2011.
Wello, a Finish-based company, first tested its Penguin wave energy converter at the EMEC site throughout 2012/2013. The Penguin was reinstalled at EMEC in March 2017 as part of a Horizon 2020 research and innovation project.
 Seatricity, an Antigua-based company, tested its technology at EMEC in 2014. The wave converter adopted a similar method to Aquamarine Power by using its device to pump water ashore to a standard hydro-electric power take-off system.

Tidal power testing at EMEC

The tidal power test site at the Fall of Warness, to the west of the island of Eday, was chosen for its high velocity marine currents which reach almost 4 m/s (7.8 knots) at spring tides. The facility offers seven test berths at depths ranging from 25 m to 50 m in an area 2 km across and approximately 4 km in length.

From each developer berth, the subsea cables follow back along the seabed and then pass under the beach and into an onshore substation. An adjacent laydown area then provides an optional area for developers to use conditioning equipment for converting from the level at which they generate to grid compliant electricity.

The substation building has four separate areas: the HV switchroom, communications room, personnel room and the standby generator room. 

The test site was officially opened by Scotland's First Minister in September 2007.

The following tidal developers have installed and tested technologies at EMEC's Fall of Warness tidal test site:

OpenHydro was the first developer to use the site is Dublin based OpenHydro, who began the installation of their open centered turbine in 2006. OpenHydro became the first tidal technology to be grid connected in Scotland and subsequently the first tidal stream generator to successfully generate electricity to the national grid in the UK. OpenHydro have also placed a blank turbine on the seabed adjoining their installed device, using the specially commissioned “OpenHydro Installer”, and as at January 2016 are currently testing their 7th generation tidal technology at EMEC.
Orbital Marine Power Ltd deployed their SR250 floating tidal turbine for the first time in 2011. Their 2 MW SR2000 was installed at the site for the first time in 2016. In 12 months of continuous generation into the Orkney grid the SR2000 exported over 3 GWh of renewable electricity into the grid. The SR2000 was removed from site in September 2018 to make way for the build and installation of their optimized 2 MW floating tidal turbine, the Orbital O2, installed at EMEC in 2021.
Magallanes Renovables has tested two prototypes at EMEC: a tenth scale version, and a full-scale 2 MW floating tidal turbine. 
Atlantis Resources Corporation installed two tidal turbines: the AK-1000 tidal turbine which was subsequently replaced by the AR-1000. Following prototype testing at EMEC, the company progressed with development of the next generation turbine – the AR1500 - which is deployed as part of the MeyGen project. 
Alstom (formerly Tidal Generation Ltd): TGL deployed at their 500 kW DeepGen tidal turbine at EMEC in 2009, and began generating to the grid the following year. They subsequently replaced the 500 kW device with a 1MW version of the technology at EMEC.
ANDRITZ HYDRO Hammerfest installed their 1MW HS1000 tidal energy converter in 2011. The technology was then further developed into a 1.5MW device which has been installed at MeyGen off the coast of Caithness. 
Tocardo demonstrated its T2 tidal turbine at EMEC in 2017. 
Sustainable Marine Energy (SME) brought its PLAT-O 1 MW tidal system, a moored buoyant platform that is positioned mid-water column, to test at EMEC in April 2016. 
Voith deployed their Hy-Tide 1MW turbine at the Fall of Warness in 2013.

To balance the fluctuating tidal power and supply the 670 kW hydrogen electrolyser, a 1.8 MWh Vanadium redox battery was installed in 2022.

For the most up-to-date information regarding technologies testing at EMEC, visit: EMEC tidal clients and EMEC wave clients

Non-grid connected test sites
EMEC has also worked to ease the path to market for marine renewable developers by developing test sites in less challenging conditions, helping to close the gap between testing in a wave or tidal tank and bringing full-scale prototypes to trial in real sea conditions.

These non-grid connected test sites - situated at Shapinsay Sound and Scapa Flow - provide a more flexible sea space for use by smaller scale technologies, supply chain companies, and equipment manufacturers. Such accessible real sea testing enables marine energy developers and suppliers to learn lessons more cheaply by reducing the need for big vessels or large plant.

At these sites multi-point anchoring systems provide developers with a fully functional alternative to either bringing their own gravity base or having to drill and install anchor chains and mooring blocks. Bespoke test support buoys allow developers to dissipate the electricity generated by their devices in an environmentally conscious way, while transferring wave and tidal data back to the control center. An area of seabed is also available for rehearsal of deployment techniques.

Technologies that have tested at EMEC's non-grid connected sites include:

Flumill
Nautricity
Magallanes
EC-OG
CorPower Ocean

Performance Assessment
EMEC is accredited to test laboratory standards (ISO 17025) and can test the performance of wave and tidal energy devices against IEC Technical Specifications.

Technical Verification
EMEC can provide independent verification in accordance with ISO 17020 to confirm that a wave energy converter satisfies its conceptual reliability, survivability and performance targets. With proof of performance credibly assured, you can reduce the technological risk for technology purchasers, helping to attract investment and increase your market share.

Marine industry standards
EMEC has coordinated the development of a suite of standards on behalf of the marine renewable energy industry. Each document has been progressed by a working group with individuals representing technology developers, regulators, academia, utilities, and project developers – a true cross-section of the marine energy industry. These standards were launched in 2009.

In March 2014, EMEC, in collaboration with the Offshore Renewable Energy Catapult (ORE Catapult), facilitated a workshop to review the existing suite of EMEC standards and identify areas where new standards require to be developed.

Research and monitoring
For most developers coming to deploy at EMEC, installation at these facilities will be the first time their device has been in the open sea and grid connected. They typically will not have a track record which indicates the type and extent of interactions between the device and the receiving environment. Therefore, whilst the central purpose of EMEC is to provide an operational test facility, there is also a key role in establishing and facilitating monitoring of devices in relation to their impacts on the receiving environment. The main driver to this has been through the consenting process, which requires developers to consider environmental issues prior to testing at EMEC and to mitigate against any potential for negative impact.

The involvement within the research field has led EMEC to occupy a unique position, having links with a range of different developers and devices, as well as academic institutions and regulatory bodies. EMEC is independent of any developer or device, as EMEC aims to ensure that different devices are monitored in a consistent way, using the best available methods. Independence of EMEC also encourages the dissemination of monitoring information can be carried out throughout the industry.

A submerged Microsoft data center was tested at the site, suggesting that the data needs of major cities could be served by underwater data centers powered by offshore wind farms.

Power Purchase Agreement 
SmartestEnergy has signed a Power Purchase Agreement with the EMEC, for the power generated from their wave and tidal devices in the Orkney Islands.

Green hydrogen 

EMEC's hydrogen production plant is located onshore at EMEC's Caldale site on Eday in close proximity to EMEC's grid-connected tidal test site at the Fall of Warness. Producing hydrogen and using it as an energy storage medium is a solution to overcome local grid constraints, enabling large scale renewable integration. Orkney has become a leading example of a developing hydrogen economy and offers a demonstration site for new hydrogen technologies with EMEC supporting and actively collaborating on hydrogen research projects.

In 2016, EMEC installed a 0.5 MW rapid response PEM (Proton Exchange Membrane) electrolyser in the laydown area adjacent to the substation to produce ‘green’ hydrogen from excess renewable energy produced by tidal energy converters testing at the Fall of Warness and from the 900 kW Eday community wind turbine.

In 2017 EMEC achieved the world's first tidal generated hydrogen using power from tidal energy clients, Orbital and Tocardo, which were testing tidal energy devices on site.

Energy systems 

EMEC is also involved in wider energy systems demonstration projects.

Microsoft deployed a 450 kW subsea data center at EMEC's wave test site in 2018. The project was part of Microsoft's ongoing quest for cloud data center solutions that are less resource intensive and offer rapid provisioning, lower costs, and high agility to meet the needs of cloud users around the world. Deepwater deployment offers ready access to cooling, a controlled environment, and has the potential to be powered by co-located renewable power sources, such as the pioneering wave and tidal energy technologies testing nearby at EMEC's test sites.

EMEC is also leading an exciting new project called ReFLEX Orkney looking to decarbonise the wider energy system. ReFLEX aims to integrate electricity, transport and heat systems in Orkney using clever software coupled with an increase of flexible demand assets like batteries and electric vehicles.

This will help Orkney maximize the potential of its renewable energy resource, provide more affordable energy services, and lower the county's carbon footprint by decreasing reliance on imported carbon-intensive grid electricity from the UK mainland.

See also

 E.ON
 Renewable energy in Scotland

References

External links
EMEC Orkney EMEC Website

Public bodies of the Scottish Government
Renewable energy in Scotland
Buildings and structures in Orkney
Electricity policy in Scotland
Tidal power stations
Wave farms in Scotland
Stromness